The two-stage 2014 MLS Re-Entry Draft took place on December 12, 2014 (Stage 1) and December 18, 2014 (Stage 2). All 20 Major League Soccer clubs were eligible to participate.

The priority order for the Re-Entry Draft was reverse order of finish in 2014, taking into account playoff performance. Unlike other 2014-15 offseason drafts, the 2015 expansion sides Orlando City SC and New York City FC were placed at the bottom of the selection order.
 
Available to all teams in Stage 1 of the Re-Entry draft were:
 Players who were at least 23 years old and had a minimum of three years experience in MLS whose options were not exercised by their clubs (available at option salary for 2015).
 Players who were at least 25 years old with a minimum of four years of MLS experience who were out of contract and whose club did not wish to re-sign them at their previous salary (available for at least their 2014 salary).
 Players who were at least 30 years old with a minimum of eight years of MLS experience who were out of contract and whose club did not wish to re-sign them (available for at least 105% of their 2014 salary).

Players who were not selected in Stage 1 of the Re-Entry Draft were made available in Stage 2. Clubs selecting players in Stage 2 were able to negotiate a new salary with the player. Players who remained unselected after Stage 2 were made available to any MLS club on a first-come, first-served basis.

Teams also had the option of passing on their selection.

Available players
Players were required to meet age and service requirements to participate as stipulated by the terms of the MLS Collective Bargaining Agreement. The league released a list of all players available for the Re-Entry Draft on December 11, 2014. Eligible Players

Stage One
The first stage of the 2014 MLS Re-Entry Draft took place on December 12, 2014.

Round 1

Round 2

Stage Two
The second stage of the 2014 MLS Re-Entry Draft took place on December 18, 2014.

Round 1

Round 2

Round 3

References

Categories 

Major League Soccer drafts
Mls Re-entry Draft, 2014
MLS Re-Entry Draft